The People's Republic of China is a Communist state that came to power in 1949 after a civil war. After the Korean war in 1950-1953 and the Sino-Soviet split in the 1960s, China emerged as a great power and one of the three big players in the tri-polar geopolitics (PRC-US-USSR) during the late Cold war (1956-1991) with its status as a recognized nuclear weapons state in 1960s. Currently, China has the world's largest population, second largest GDP (nominal) (after the U.S.) and the largest economy in the world by PPP. China is now considered an emerging global superpower. 

In 1950-1953 it fought an undeclared war in Korea against the United States. Until the late 1950s it was allied with the Soviet Union but by 1960 they began a bitter contest for control over the local Communist movement in many countries.  It reached détente with the United States in 1972. After CCP Chairman Mao Zedong died in 1976, Deng Xiaoping led a massive process of industrialization and emphasized trade relations with the world, while maintaining a low key, less ideological foreign policy, widely described by the phrase taoguang yanghui, or "hide one's talent and bide one's time". The Chinese economy grew very rapidly giving it steadily increasing power and ambition.
 
Since Xi Jinping assumed to General Secretary of the Chinese Communist Party in 2012, China has expanded its foreign policy ambitions on the global scale, with special emphasis on the East China Sea.  China is investing heavily in global infrastructure, citing a desire for economic integration. It is also investing in strategic locations to secure its trade and security interests. It calls these programs "One Belt, One Road" and the "Maritime Silk Road", which it sees as part of its goal of self-sufficiency. In the 2019, the Pew Research Center made a survey on attitude to Xi Jinping among six-country medians based on Australia, India, Indonesia, Japan, Philippines and South Korea. The survey indicated that a median 29% have confidence in Xi Jinping to do the right thing regarding world affairs, meanwhile a median of 45% have no confidence. These number are almost same with those of North Korean leader Kim Jong Un (23% confidence, 53% no confidence).

Since 2017 it has engaged in a large-scale trade war with the United States. It is also challenging U.S. dominance in the Pacific and Indian Ocean, expanding its military naval and diplomatic efforts.  Part of this is the String of Pearls strategy securing strategic locations in the Indian Ocean and Strait of Malacca region.

Foreign policy institutions 
The main institutions of foreign policy are the Central Foreign Affairs Commission of the Chinese Communist Party (CCP), Ministry of Foreign Affairs, the CCP International Liaison Department, and the CCP United Front Work Department.

The Central Foreign Affairs Leadership Small Group (FALSG) has historically been a semi-institutional foreign policy coordination body. Created in 1958, it was disbanded during the Cultural Revolution and restored in 1981 as Deng Xiaoping increased the number of stakeholders involved in the development of foreign policy. It became a forum for the central leadership in charge of foreign policy to meet regularly with top bureaucrats to discuss priorities, achieve consensus, and prepare recommendations for the Politburo. It was the only standing foreign policy coordination body until the aftermath of the United States-led NATO bombing of the Chinese embassy in Belgrade, which prompted the creation of the Central National Security Leadership Small Group (NSLSG) in 2000 to coordinate national security crisis response. 

To address policy coordination on maritime issues, Hu Jintao created The Protecting Maritime Rights and Interests LSG in 2012.

In his effort to build additional institutional capacity for foreign policy coordination, Xi Jinping created the State Security Commission (SSC), which absorbed the NSLG. The SSC's focus is "holistic national security," and it addresses both external and internal security matters.

Long-term goals 
Political scientist Dmitry Shlapentokh argues that CCP leader Xi Jinping and his top leadership are developing plans for global predominance based on rapidly growing economic power. The ideological framework is a specialized blend of Marxist–Leninism, coupled with China's pre-1800 historic claims to world dominance. China's trade policy and drive for access to essential natural resources, such as gas, are articulated in terms of these ideological approaches. Beijing balances both purely economic goals with geopolitical strategies regarding the United States, Russia and other powers. Balancing those two powers gives China a clear advantage, for its totalitarian government could plan for generations and could change course regardless of the wishes of the electorate or clearly defined interest groups, as is the case with the modern capitalist West.

Lowell Dittmer argues that in dealing with the goal of dominance over East Asia, Beijing has to juggle its relations with the United States, which has more military and economic power in the region because of close U.S. ties with Japan, South Korea, Taiwan, Vietnam, Australia and other countries.

Analysts argue that Beijing is not yet ready to become a major force in shaping regional politics in the Middle East. While China has major commercial interests in the Middle East and a long history of relations with Gulf Cooperation Council countries, its involvement in Gulf security affairs is relatively recent. China articulates a "zero-enemy policy" in the Gulf region, taking a balanced attitude towards both incumbent governments and opposition forces, Sunni and Shi'a, republics and monarchies, and Iran and the Arab countries.  

Since the late 1990s, China has articulated its new security concept, the overarching principle of which is that no single state, even the most powerful, is capable of coping with all security challenges alone.

China has shown a moderate interest in the Caribbean region in recent years, but not nearly on the same scale as its interest in Asia and Africa. It has been developing ties with Cuba, the Bahamas, Jamaica, the Dominican Republic and Haiti, as well as Colombia. These small countries have not by 2019 noticeably changed their foreign or domestic policies because of their new economic linkages with China. Nevertheless, the governments pay more attention to Beijing's views. On the other hand, China's push into the Caribbean is increasingly resented by the United States and further escalation between the two major powers is a possibility in the region.

In 2014, Xi announced the New Asian Security Concept at a summit of the Conference on Interaction and Confidence-Building in Asia (CICA). Implying that Asian countries can handle their security without the involvement of the United States, the core of the New Asian Security Concept is that "Asian issues should be taken care of by Asians, and Asian security should be maintained by Asians."

Wolf warrior diplomacy

Wolf warrior diplomacy is an aggressive style of coercive diplomacy adopted by Chinese diplomats under Xi Jinping's administration. Wolf warrior diplomacy is confrontational and combative, with its proponents loudly denouncing any perceived criticism of the Chinese government and its policies on social media and in interviews. As an attempt to gain "discourse power" in international politics, wolf warrior diplomacy forms one part of a new foreign policy strategy called Xi Jinping's "Major Country Diplomacy" which has legitimized a more active role for China on the world stage, including engaging in an open ideological struggle with the West.

Status of Taiwan

The People's Republic of China (PRC) considers Taiwan area administered by Republic of China (ROC), part of its inviolable sovereign territory. The ROC was founded in Mainland China in 1912 deposing the Chinese monarchy while Taiwan was under Japanese rule from 1895 and regained in 1945, but Taiwan became the seat of the ROC central government since 1949 and later lost its international representation as "China" in the United Nations in 1971 to the PRC.

Along with the ROC, in PRC's perspective, Taiwan is described a separatist, breakaway province that must be reunified, by force if necessary.  Under the One China policy, any polity exerts efforts for countries recognizing either the PRC or ROC to switch their recognition to the other.

South China Sea 

China has staked its territorial claims in the disputed South China Sea with the Nine-Dash Line. Its claims are disputed by other countries. The contested area in the South China Sea includes the Paracel Islands, the Spratly Islands, and various other areas including Pratas Island and the Vereker Banks, the Macclesfield Bank and the Scarborough Shoal. The claim encompasses the area of Chinese land reclamation known as the "Great Wall of Sand".

The United States Navy has conducted freedom of navigation operations asserting its position that some waters claimed by China are international waters.

On July 12, 2016, an arbitral tribunal constituted under Annex VII to the 1982 United Nations Convention on the Law of the Sea ruled that China has no legal basis to claim "historic rights" within its nine-dash line in a case brought by the Philippines. The tribunal judged that there was no evidence that China had historically exercised exclusive control over the waters or resources within the Nine-Dash Line.

The ruling was rejected by both Taiwan and China. The People's Republic of China and the Republic of China (Taiwan) stated that they did not recognize the tribunal and insisted that the matter should be resolved through bilateral negotiations with other claimants.  However, the tribunal did not rule on the ownership of the islands or delimit maritime boundaries.

Scholars have been probing the Chinese motivations and long-term expectations. One approach is to compare trends in multilateral Code of Conduct negotiations between 1992 and 2016. In general, the sovereignty issue regarding contested waters is no longer a central major concern For three reasons: the inconsistency of China's official claims over time, China's increased bargaining power, and the importance of the shelved sovereignty axiom since the era of Deng Xiaoping.

See also 
 South China Sea disputes
 Belt and Road Initiative
 Maritime Silk Road
 String of Pearls (Indian Ocean)
 Political status of Taiwan
 China and the United Nations
 History of foreign relations of China
 Community of Common Destiny
 Old friends of the Chinese people

Notes

References

Further reading

Alden, Christopher.  China Returns to Africa: A Superpower and a Continent Embrace (2008)
 Bajpai, Kanti, Selina Ho, and Manjari Chatterjee Miller, eds. Routledge Handbook of China–India Relations (Routledge, 2020). excerpt
Cohen, Warren I.  America's Response to China: A History of Sino-American Relations (2010) excerpt and text search
 Fenby, Jonathan. The Penguin History of Modern China: The Fall and Rise of a Great Power 1850 to the Present (3rd ed. 2019) popular history.
 Ferdinand, Peter. "Westward ho—the China dream and ‘one belt, one road’: Chinese foreign policy under Xi Jinping." International Affairs 92.4 (2016): 941-957. online
 Foot, Rosemary, and Amy King. "Assessing the deterioration in China–US relations: US governmental perspectives on the economic-security nexus." China International Strategy Review 1.1 (2019): 39-50 online
 Garver, John W. China's Quest: The History of the Foreign Relations of the People's Republic (2nd ed. 2018) comprehensive scholarly history. excerpt
 Garver, John W. Foreign relations of the People's Republic of China (1992) online
 Garver, John W. Protracted Contest: Sino-Indian Rivalry in the Twentieth Century (2001), post 1950.
 Green, Michael J. By more than providence: Grand strategy and American power in the Asia Pacific since 1783 (Columbia UP, 2017) online
 Hu, Weixing. "Xi Jinping's ‘Major Country Diplomacy’: The Role of Leadership in Foreign Policy Transformation." Journal of Contemporary China 28.115 (2019): 1-14.
 Lampton, David M. Following the Leader: Ruling China, from Deng Xiaoping to Xi Jinping (U of California Press, 2014).
 Liu, Guoli, ed., Chinese Foreign Policy in Transition. (Transaction,  2004).  
 Lu, Ning. The dynamics of foreign-policy decisionmaking in China (Routledge, 2018).
 Quested, Rosemary K.I. Sino-Russian relations: a short history (Routledge, 2014) online
 Sutter, Robert G. Historical Dictionary of Chinese Foreign Policy (2011) excerpt and text search
Sutter, Robert G. Foreign Relations of the PRC: The Legacies and Constraints of China's International Politics Since 1949 (Rowman & Littlefield; 2013) 355 pages excerpt and text search
 Swaine, Michael D. "Chinese views of foreign policy in the 19th party congress." China Leadership Monitor 55 (2018).  online re 2017 Congress
Westad, Odd Arne. Restless Empire: China and the World Since 1750 (Basic Books; 2012) 515 pages; comprehensive scholarly history
Yahuda, Michael. End of Isolationism: China's Foreign Policy After Mao  (Macmillan International Higher Education, 2016)
 Yea, Andy.  "Maritime territorial disputes in East Asia: a comparative analysis of the South China Sea and the East China Sea." Journal of Current Chinese Affairs 40.2 (2011): 165-193. Online
 Zhang. Ketian. “Cautious Bully: Reputation, Resolve, and Beijing's Use of Coercion in the South China Sea,” International Security 44:1 (Summer 2019): 117-159.